Bradea is a genus of flowering plants in the family Rubiaceae. It was first described by Paul Carpenter Standley in 1932 and is named after the German botanist Alexander Curt Brade. All 6 species are endemic to Brazil, hence the name of the type species.

Species

 Bradea anomala Brade
 Bradea bicornuta Brade
 Bradea borrerioides J.A.Oliveira & Sobrado
 Bradea brasiliensis Standl.
 Bradea kuhlmanni Brade
 Bradea montana Brade

References

External links
World Checklist of Rubiaceae

Rubiaceae genera
Coussareeae
Endemic flora of Brazil